was a province of Japan, located in Kinai. It overlaps the southern part of modern Kyoto Prefecture on Honshū. It is classified as an upper province in the Engishiki.

Yamashiro Province included Kyoto itself, as in 794 AD Yamashiro became the seat of the imperial court, and, during the Muromachi period, was the seat of the Ashikaga shogunate as well. The capital remained in Yamashiro until its de facto move to Tokyo in the 1870s.

History
"Yamashiro" was formerly written with the characters meaning "mountain" and "era"; in the 7th century, there were things built listing the name of the province with the characters for "mountain" and "ridge"/"back". On 4 December 794 (8 Shimotsuki, 13th year of Enryaku), at the time of the establishment of Heian-kyō, because Emperor Kanmu made his new capital utilize the surroundings as natural fortification, the character for shiro was finally changed to "castle". Later shiro from the province name replaced the older ki as the Japanese reading for the character 城.

Just from Nara period writings, it is apparent that the "area" and "ridge" listings coexisted.

In the Shūgaishō, Otokuni District is mentioned as the seat, as well as in the Setsuyōshū.

As for the shugos mansion, at first, Yamashiro Province shugo and Kyoto shugo were concurrent posts, so the Kyoto shugo's kogenins mansion had to be allotted. Afterwards, the Rokuhara Tandai came to be an additional post, and that became the shugo as well. In the Muromachi period, Yamashiro Province was divided with the Uji River as the border into two districts, and each came to be assigned a shugo, so one shugo resided in Uji Makishima, whereas the other resided in various places around Yodo and such.

Temples
The provincial temples included those where the resident chief priest was a man, and those where it was a woman in Sōraku District. Kuni no Miya's Daigokuden was made a temple in 746. It was destroyed by fire in 882, and the rebuilding afterwards would decline. In the Kamakura period, it came to be a branch temple of Byōdō-in. The location is in modern Kizugawa city, coinciding with Kamo. In 1925, a large number of old tiles were excavated near the provincial temple, and it is thought that these once belonged to the convent.

The Kamo Shrines—the Kamigamo Shrine in the Kita ward of Kyoto and the Shimogamo Shrine in Sakyō ward—were designated as the two chief Shinto shrines (ichinomiya) of Yamashiro province.

Yamashiro's ichinomiya designation differed from other provinces', likely due to the Jingi-kan; from nearly the end of the 11th century, when the primary shrines were being established in each of the various provinces, it is thought that in Kinai, it was decided on after the turn on the 12th century. There were no ninomiya (secondary shrines). It is unknown whether there were any sōja.

Historical districts
 Kyoto Prefecture
 
  - dissolved
  - dissolved
  - dissolved
  - dissolved

Shugo

Kamakura Shogunate
–1221 – concurrent post with Kyoto shugo
1221–1333 – concurrent post with Rokuhara Tandai

Muromachi Shogunate
1353–1384 – concurrent post with Samurai-dokoro
1385–1386 – Yamana Ujikiyo
1389 – Akamatsu Yoshinori
1389–1390 – Yamana Ujikiyo
1390–1391 – Akamatsu Yoshinori
1391 – Yamana Ujikiyo
1392–1394 – Hatakeyama Motokuni
1394–1399 – Ketsushiro Mandō 
1399 – Kyōgoku Takanori
1399–1402 – Ketsushiro Mandō
1402–1403 – Hatakeyama Motokuni
1404–1416 – Takashi Morohide 
1418–1421 – Isshiki Yoshitsura
1421–1423 – Kyōgoku Takakazu
1424–1428 – Kyōgoku Mochimitsu
1428–1433 – Hatakeyama Mitsuie
1433–1434 – Hatakeyama Mochikuni
1434–1436 – Isshiki Yoshitsura
1436–1439 – Akamatsu Mitsusuke
1440–1441 – Yamana Mochitoyo
1441–1447 – Kyōgoku Mochikiyo
1447–1449 – Isshiki Norichika
1450–1455 – Hatakeyama Mochikuni
1455–1460 – Hatakeyama Yoshinari
1460–1463 – Hatakeyama Masanaga
1464–1468 – Yamana Koretoyo
1474–1478 – Yamana Masatoyo
1478–1483 – Hatakeyama Masanaga
1483–1486 – Akamatsu Masanori 
1486–1490 – Ise Sadamune 
1493–1507 – Ise Sadamichi
1508–1518 – Ōuchi Yoshioki
1518–1531 – Hosokawa Takakuni
1532–1549 – Hosokawa Harumoto

Kami of Yamashiro
Fujiwara no Muneyo
Obata Toramori
Saitō Dōsan
Araki Ujitsuna
Jushii-ge Matsunaga Hisahide
Ryūzōji Takanobu
Jugoi-ge Naoe Kanetsugu(from 1583)
Jugoi-ge Toki Sadamasa(from 1593)
Jugoi-ge Toki Sadayoshi
Jugoi-ge Takenokoshi Masanobu (from 1611)
Jugoi-ge Toki Yoriyuki (from 1624)
Jugoi-ge Takenokoshi Masaharu
Jugoi-ge Takenokoshi Masateru
Jugoi-ge Takenokoshi Masatake
Jugoi-ge Takenokoshi Katsuoki
Takenokoshi Mutsumura
Jugoi-ge Takenokoshi Masasada 
Jugoi-ge Nagai Naosuke
Jugoi-ge Nagai Naonori

See also
List of Provinces of Japan
Yamashiro ikki
Capital of Japan
Shi sakai
IJN battleship Yamashiro

Notes

References
 Nussbaum, Louis-Frédéric and Käthe Roth. (2005).  Japan encyclopedia. Cambridge: Harvard University Press. ;  OCLC 58053128

External links 

  Murdoch's map of provinces, 1903